Dampier is a major industrial port in the Pilbara region in the northwest of Western Australia. It is located near the city of Karratha and Port Walcott.

Dampier Port is part of the Dampier Archipelago and is primarily a port for the export of iron ore from Rio Tinto mines, LNG and salt. The port services petrochemical, salt, iron ore and natural gas export industries. Rio Tinto exports large volumes of iron ore, especially Pilbara blend through the port, and in September 2010 announced plans to expand capacity. At the 2011 census, Dampier had a population of 1,341.

History
 The Yaburrara Aboriginal tribe lived in the area for many thousands of years.

The town derives its name from its location on Dampier Island 3 km off the Pilbara Coast and part of the Dampier Archipelago, both named after the English navigator William Dampier. In 1963, the island became an artificial peninsula when it was connected to the mainland by a causeway for a road and railway. In 1979, Dampier Peninsular was renamed after Mt Burrup, the highest peak on the island, which had been named after Henry Burrup, a Union Bank clerk murdered in 1885 at Roebourne.

In 1699, Dampier, in command of the 26-gun warship HMS Roebuck on a mission to explore the coast of New Holland, following the Dutch route to the Indies, passed between Dirk Hartog Island and the Western Australian mainland into what he called Shark Bay. He then followed the coast northeast, on 21 August 1699, reaching the Dampier Archipelago, which he explored, naming Rosemary Island. He continued to Lagrange Bay, just south of what is now Roebuck Bay, before sailing for Timor.

The town was built from 1965 onwards, to serve the railway transporting iron ore from Tom Price and Paraburdoo. By 1968, the further expansion of Dampier had been constrained by geographical factors and a new town of Karratha was established on the mainland as a result.

Environment
The Burrup Peninsula, or Murujuga, which means "Hip Bone Sticking Out" in the Yaburrara language, is home to what is believed to be the largest collection of petroglyphs (ancient rock art) in the world.

There are 42 other islands in the Dampier Archipelago. There is a hugely diverse marine ecosystem around the islands, including whales, dugongs, turtles, coral and sponges. Green turtles, (Chelonia mydas) are known to nest in the Dampier Archipelago.

Climate
Under the Köppen climate classification, Dampier has a desert climate (BWh). Dampier has extremely hot and humid summers with dewpoints exceeding . Having over 3,700 hours of annual sunshine, it is one of the sunniest places in Australia and in the world; its sunshine hours approach those of Aswan in Egypt.

Attractions
At the entrance to the town is a statue of "Red Dog", a red kelpie/cattledog well known for roaming the area in the 1970s and hitching rides to nearby towns. The statue reads "Erected by the many friends made during his travels". Other attractions include the fishing not far off the coast, the most commonly targeted species being barramundi (Lates calcarifer).

Port

The port of Dampier was opened in 1966, when the first iron ore from the Mount Tom Price mine was transported via the Hamersley & Robe River railway to Parker Point and loaded on ships. The port at East Intercourse Island opened in 1972.

The port has an annual loading capacity of 140 million tonnes of iron ore. Rio Tinto's other iron ore port, Cape Lambert, can handle 80 million tonnes per year. It takes from 24 to 36 hours to load a ship at port. With the neighboring ports of Port Hedland and Port Walcott, Dampier is one of three major iron ore exporting ports in the Pilbara region The closest airport to the port is Karratha, located less than 20 kilometers away.

Photos

Panoramas

See also
 Pilbara historical timeline
 Red Dog Story

References

External links

 Dampier Port Authority 
 The Burrup Peninsula  The National Trust of Australia
 The World Monuments Fund: Dampier Rock Art Complex
 Dampier Port Authority 

Coastal towns in Western Australia
Dampier Archipelago
Mining towns in Western Australia
North West Shelf
Ports and harbours of Western Australia
Port cities and towns of the Indian Ocean
Port cities in Western Australia
City of Karratha